Viktor Dubino is a Ukrainian retired footballer.

Playing career
A pupil of Smolensk SKA, the first coach - V. Belokon. In 1965 he began his football career as a member of the reserve team of Nyva Vinnytsia. The following year he moved to Shakhtar Donetsk, but even here he played exclusively for the reserve squad. In the summer of 1966 he went to Shakhtar Yenakiyevo. In the summer of 1969 he moved to the Karpaty Mukacheve. In the summer of 1970 he became a player of Hoverla Uzhhorod, as part of which he ended his career as a player in 1972. After a long break, in 1991 he returned to the football field, playing 1 match as part of the Dnipro Cherkasy.

Coaching career
At the end of his career, the player began coaching. In 1991 he worked as the technical director of Dnipro Cherkasy. In 1993, until August, he headed Ros Bila Tserkva. After the end of his career as a football player, he started working as a coach. In 1991 практика на the post of technical director of Dnipro Cherkasy. In 1993, until August, he was in charge of Ros Bila Tserkva . In early 1994 he was appointed head coach of Desna Chernihiv", which he headed until August 1994. On April 17, 2018, he headed the amateur team Krystal Chortkiv.

References

External links 
 Viktor Dubino footballfacts.ru

1946 births
Living people
FC Desna Chernihiv managers
FC Hoverla Uzhhorod managers
FC Ros Bila Tserkva managers
Ukrainian footballers
Ukrainian Premier League players
Ukrainian First League players
Ukrainian Second League players
Association football goalkeepers